Barnowski Młyn  is a former settlement in the administrative district of Gmina Kołczygłowy, within Bytów County, Pomeranian Voivodeship, in northern Poland.

Before 1637 Duchy of Pomerania, next area of Farther Pomerania, was part of Germany. For the history of the region, see History of Pomerania.

References

Villages in Bytów County